Tatil is a rural locality (a selo) in Khapilsky Selsoviet, Tabasaransky District, Republic of Dagestan, Russia. The population was 1,132 as of 2010. There are 7 streets.

Geography 
Tatil is located 7 km northeast of Khuchni (the district's administrative centre) by road. Khapil is the nearest rural locality.

References 

Rural localities in Tabasaransky District